Hackmans Gate is a hamlet in the parish of Broome, and the district of Wyre Forest District of Worcestershire, England.

Hamlets in Worcestershire